Suspicion is a British thriller television miniseries based on the Israeli series False Flag. Set in London and New York City, the series premiered on Apple TV+ on 4 February 2022. It received generally mixed reviews from critics.

Premise 
Five people – three men and two women – have their lives turned upside down after being identified by London police as suspects in the kidnapping and subsequent disappearance of American media mogul Katherine Newman's son Leonardo.

Cast

Main
 Kunal Nayyar as Aadesh Chopra
 Georgina Campbell as Natalie Thompson
 Elyes Gabel as Sean Tilson
 Elizabeth Henstridge as Tara McAllister
 Angel Coulby as Vanessa Okoye
 Tom Rhys Harries as Eddie Walker
 Robert Glenister as Martin Copeland
 Lydia West as Monique Thompson
 Clare Perkins as Lydia Thompson
 Gerran Howell as Leo Newman
 Karl Johnson as Eric Cresswell
 Jennifer Ehle as Amy
 Noah Emmerich as Scott Anderson
 Uma Thurman as Katherine Newman

Supporting 
 Ross McCall as Owen Neilssen 
 Mandip Gill as Sonia Chopra
 Parth Thakerar as Shiv Kapoor
 Faraz Ayub as Ajay Kapoor
 Kulvinder Ghir as Rakesh Kapoor
 Ben Bailey Smith as Joe Gibson
 Martin Savage as Reuben Carson
 Ian McElhinney as Sean’s Grandad
 Dominic Tighe as Steve McAllister
 Bijan Daneshmand as Masoud Ghorbani

Episodes

Production

Development 
In July 2019, Apple announced the development of an English-language version of award-winning Israeli thriller False Flag, created by Maria Feldman and Amit Cohen, with Keshet International, the distribution and production arm of Keshet Media Group, the same company behind the original Hebrew-language series. In March 2020, Apple ordered an eight-part series to be produced by Keshet's British production arm, Keshet UK, and directed by Chris Long, with Rob Williams serving as showrunner. Both also executive produced along with Howard Burch, Avi Nir, Anna Winger, Maria Feldman, Amit Cohen and Liat Benasuly.

Casting 
Along with the series order in March 2020, Uma Thurman was cast to star in Suspicion, with Kunal Nayyar, Noah Emmerich, Georgina Campbell, Elyes Gabel, Elizabeth Henstridge, and Angel Coulby also joining the cast. In November 2020, it was reported that Tom Rhys Harries had joined the cast.

Filming 
As of March 2020, production had reportedly begun in the United Kingdom on Suspicion, but had to be suspended due the COVID-19 pandemic. In September 2020, Apple was reportedly preparing to restart filming in England, with filming confirmed to have started in November 2020 in Brixham. Filming also occurred in New York City in May 2021, with several cast members being seen on set in Central Park, Washington Square Park, and the Upper East Side. Season one concluded filming on May 18, 2021.

Release 
The eight-part series premiered with two episodes being released on Apple TV+ on Friday, 4 February 2022, with the remaining six episodes airing every Friday thereafter.

Reception 

The Hollywood Reporters Angie Han writes, "Suspicion is broadly competent, in that the dialogue is serviceable, the performances unobjectionable (though those watching for Thurman should be warned she’s barely in it at all), the narrative easy enough to follow." Barbara Ellen of The Observer said the drama was "undone by erratic drama and nonsensical themes". The Wall Street Journal 's Dorothy Rabinowitz was more complimentary, dubbing it "ambitious".

References

External links 
 

2022 British television series debuts
2022 British television series endings
2020s British drama television series
British thriller television series
British television series based on non-British television series
International television series based on Israeli television series
Television shows filmed in England
Television shows filmed in New York City
Apple TV+ original programming
Television productions suspended due to the COVID-19 pandemic
English-language television shows
Television series set in 2021